The 1992 United States Senate election in Illinois was held on November 3, 1992. Incumbent Democratic U.S. Senator Alan J. Dixon decided to run for re-election a third term, but was defeated in the primary against Carol Moseley Braun, who ended up winning the general election. Until 2022, this was the last time a single party won Illinois's Class 3 Senate seat in two or more consecutive elections.

Braun, whose victory coincided with Bill Clinton's win in the presidential election and Illinois, made history in this election by becoming the first African American woman ever elected to the U.S. Senate, and also the first African American elected to the Senate as a Democrat. Braun was also both the first African American and the first woman elected to the U.S. Senate from the state of Illinois.

Primaries were held March 17.

Election information
The primaries and general elections coincided with those for other federal elections (president and House), as well as those for state offices.

Turnout
For the primaries, turnout was 35.20%, with 2,064,347 votes cast. For the general election, turnout was 74.84%, with 4,939,557 votes cast.

Democratic Primary

Candidates 
 Carol Moseley Braun, Cook County Recorder of Deeds and former State Representative
 Alan J. Dixon, incumbent U.S. Senator
 Albert Hofeld, attorney

Results

Analysis 
This defeat shocked observers; at the time no Senator had been defeated in a primary in over a decade and Dixon had a long record of electoral success. He was a moderate Democrat, who recently voted to confirm Clarence Thomas to the Supreme Court. Braun, a black woman and known reformist liberal, got a large share of black, liberal, and women voters ("The Year of the Woman").

In addition, she carried Cook County, Illinois, by far the most populated county in the state. Another factor was the third candidate in the race, multi-millionaire attorney Al Hofeld. Hofeld drew away some of the moderate and conservative Democrats who normally supported Dixon. He also spent a lot of money running advertisements attacking Dixon, weakening his support.

Republican primary
Richard S. Williamson ran unopposed in the Republican primary.

General election

Candidates

Major 
 Carol Moseley Braun (D), Cook County Recorder of Deeds, former State Rep.
 Richard S. Williamson (R), former Assistant Secretary of State for International Organization Affairs

Minor 
 Kathleen Kaku (SW)
 Chad Koppie (I)
 Alan J. Port (NA)
 Andrew B. Spiegel (L)
 Charles A. Winter (NL)

Results 
Moseley Braun won the 1992 Illinois Senate Race by a fairly comfortable margin. Moseley Braun did well as expected in Cook County home of Chicago. Williamson did well in the Chicago collar counties, and most northern parts of the state. Moseley Braun had a surprisingly strong showing in southern Illinois, which Republicans had come to dominate in the last several decades. Braun also did well in Rock Island County.

See also
 1992 United States Senate elections

References

1992
Illinois
United States Senate